Ronald Parker Mills (born February 25, 1951) is an American former competition swimmer and Olympic medalist.

Mills competed at the age of 17 at the 1968 Summer Olympics in Mexico City. Individually, he won a bronze medal for his third-place finish in the men's 100-meter backstroke. He also swam the backstroke leg for the gold medal-winning U.S. team in the preliminary heats of the men's 4×100-meter medley relay. 
After the Olympics, he attended Southern Methodist University in Dallas, Texas, where he swam for the SMU Mustangs swimming and diving team in National Collegiate Athletic Association (NCAA) competition.  He went on to earn All-American honors and was the Southwest Conference champion in eight individual swimming events over a three-year span.  He also swam on an American record-setting relay team, and was later inducted into the Texas Swimming & Diving Hall of Fame.

See also
 List of Olympic medalists in swimming (men)
 List of Southern Methodist University people

References
  Ronnie Mills – Olympic athlete profile at Sports-Reference.com

1951 births
Living people
American male backstroke swimmers
Olympic bronze medalists for the United States in swimming
People from Fort Worth, Texas
SMU Mustangs men's swimmers
Swimmers at the 1968 Summer Olympics
Medalists at the 1968 Summer Olympics
20th-century American people
21st-century American people